Dainius Šalenga (born 15 April 1977) is a Lithuanian retired professional basketball player. He is a small forward that is mainly known for his three–point shooting abilities. Šalenga represented the senior Lithuanian national basketball team at the 2004 Summer Olympics.

Professional career
Šalenga was the team captain of Žalgiris Kaunas, in Lithuania, before being released by the club in January 2011. Šalenga won the EuroLeague Round 6 MVP award, on December 3, 2009.

National team career
Šalenga was a member of the senior Lithuanian national basketball team. With Lithuania, he played at the 2003 EuroBasket, where he won a gold medal, and at the 2004 Summer Olympics.

Career statistics

EuroLeague

|-
| style="text-align:left;"| 2000–01
| style="text-align:center;" rowspan="10" | Žalgiris
| 6 || 1 || 22.1 || .469 || .400 || .833 || 2.3 || 1.2 || 1.0 || .2 || 7.3 || 6.7
|-
| style="text-align:left;"| 2001–02
| 14 || 10 || 30.2 || .448 || .346 || .810 || 2.6 || 1.9 || 1.4 || .4 || 11.7 || 11.3
|-
| style="text-align:left;"| 2002–03
| 10 || 6 || 27.1 || .485 || .310 || .600 || 2.2 || 1.8 || 1.0 || .4 || 8.4 || 7.2
|-
| style="text-align:left;"| 2003–04
| 20 || 16 || 27.3 || .399 || .222 || .718 || 2.4 || 2.0 || 1.0 || .2 || 7.9 || 7.6
|-
| style="text-align:left;"| 2004–05
| 20 || 19 || 33.5 || .489 || .349 || .706 || 2.8 || 3.3 || 1.5 || .3 || 12.0 || 13.1
|-
| style="text-align:left;"| 2007–08
| 17 || 2 || 12.4 || .457 || .350 || .625 || 1.9 || .3 || .5 || .1 || 3.2 || 3.4
|-
| style="text-align:left;"| 2008–09
| 10 || 5 || 26.4 || .412 || .239 || .676 || 3.1 || 1.6 || 1.2 || .2 || 11.4 || 10.5
|-
| style="text-align:left;"| 2009–10
| 16 || 16 || 27.3 || .410 || .411 || .757 || 3.0 || 1.2 || 1.3 || .1 || 10.3 || 9.8
|-
| style="text-align:left;"| 2010–11
| 10 || 7 || 20.1 || .340 || .267 || .857 || 1.6 || 1.1 || .6 || .1 || 4.8 || 3.8
|-
| style="text-align:left;"| 2011–12
| 6 || 4 || 25.1 || .412 || .375 || .1000 || 2.2 || 1.5 || .7 || .2 || 6.0 || 5.3
|-
| style="text-align:left;"| 2013–14
| style="text-align:center;"| Budivelnyk
| 7 || 5 || 24.4 || .535 || .333 || .800 || 2.4 || 2.4 || .7 || .1 || 8.0 || 10.6
|- class="sortbottom"
| style="text-align:center;" colspan="2"| Career
| 136 || 91 || 25.7 || .441 || .319 || .740 || 2.5 || 1.7 || 1.0 || .2 || 8.6 || 8.4

References

External links
Euroleague.net Profile
FIBA Profile
Eurobasket.com Profile
Spanish League Profile 
Sports-Reference.com Profile

1977 births
Living people
Basketball players at the 2004 Summer Olympics
BC Žalgiris players
BC Budivelnyk players
CB Girona players
Doping cases in basketball
Liga ACB players
Lithuanian men's basketball players
Lithuanian sportspeople in doping cases
Lithuanian expatriate basketball people in Spain
Olympic basketball players of Lithuania
Small forwards
BC Lietkabelis players
Lithuanian expatriate basketball people in Ukraine